Palais Bulles ("Bubble Palace") is a large house in Théoule-sur-Mer, near Cannes, France, that was designed by the Hungarian architect Antti Lovag. It was built for the French industrialist Pierre Bernard, and later bought by the fashion designer Pierre Cardin as a holiday home.

History
The 13,000-square-foot  house was built between 1975 and 1989 for Pierre Bernard, a French industrialist. The architect Antti Lovag hated straight lines as "an aggression against nature" and designed the house as a "form of play—spontaneous, joyful, full of surprise".

Pierre Cardin bought the house after Bernard's death in 1991. While Bernard never actually lived in the building, he said "(t)his palace has become my own bit of paradise. Its cellular forms have long reflected the outward manifestations of the image of my creations. It is a museum where I exhibit the works of contemporary designers and artists".

In 2016, a 5-year renovation by the French architect Odile Decq was completed. In March 2017, it was listed for sale with an asking price of €350 million but did not find a buyer. It could be rented to groups for $33,200 a day.

After the death of Pierre Cardin in December 2020, it has been suggested that the building be turned into a public venue for art expos.

Description
The house comprises a reception hall, panoramic lounge, 500-seat open-air amphitheatre, 10 bedrooms, various swimming pools and waterfalls in extensive landscaped grounds.

The Palais has 29 rooms, 11 bathrooms, and ten bedrooms that have each been decorated by a specific artist, including Patrice Breteau, Jerome Tisserand, Daniel You, François Chauvin,  and Gerard Cloarec.

In the popular culture
Emma Bunton, the British pop singer and formermember of the band Spice Girls shot the artwork for her 2004 album Free Me at the house in the summer of 2003.

The house was featured in Absolutely Fabulous: The Movie.

References

External links
  

Houses in Alpes-Maritimes
Houses completed in 1989
Visionary environments
20th-century architecture in France